The 21 demands of MKS was  a list of demands issued on 17 August 1980 by the Interfactory Strike Committee (Międzyzakładowy Komitet Strajkowy, MKS) in Poland.

The first demand was the right to create independent trade unions. Other demands called the government to respect the constitutional rights and freedoms, dismantling the privileges for Polish United Workers' Party members, and taking actions to improve the economic conditions of Polish citizens. The demands eventually led to the Gdańsk Agreement and creation of Solidarity.

The charter was written up on two wooden boards and hung on the gates of the shipyard on 18 August 1980. To mark the first anniversary of the August unrest, the demands were put on display in Gdańsk’s Maritime Museum. The day after Martial Law was declared one museum worker hid them in his loft, where they remained forgotten until 1996. Now added to the UNESCO Memory of the World Register, they can be found housed in Gdańsk’s Roads to Freedom exhibition.

Text

External links 
   Jak robotnicy tworzyli 21 postulatów, Polskie Radio, 17.08.2012

1980 in Poland
Solidarity (Polish trade union)
Memory of the World Register in Poland
1980 documents